André Koupouleni Senghor (born 28 January 1986), is a Senegalese footballer who played as a striker. He is currently playing for Chinese Super League team Cangzhou Mighty Lions.

Club career
Senghor was loaned to Raja Casablanca, where he scored two goals in his first league match, against CODM Meknès, the second was one of the best of season.

Senghor also played an important role in Al-Karamah's run in the AFC Champions League 2007, while he was with the club on loan during 2007.

International career
On 28 March 2009, he made his debut for the Senegal national football team against Oman.

Career statistics
.

Notes

References

External links
 
 

1986 births
Living people
Senegalese footballers
Serer sportspeople
Senegalese expatriate footballers
Expatriate footballers in Syria
ASC Jaraaf players
Al Ain FC players
Al-Karamah players
Raja CA players
Baniyas Club players
Al-Wasl F.C. players
Shenzhen F.C. players
Inner Mongolia Zhongyou F.C. players
Cangzhou Mighty Lions F.C. players
China League One players
Chinese Super League players
Expatriate footballers in China
Senegalese expatriate sportspeople in China
UAE Pro League players
Association football forwards
Syrian Premier League players
Senegal international footballers